Abramovo is a rural locality (a village) in Staroselskoye Rural Settlement of Vologodsky District, Vologda Oblast, Russia. The population was 6 as of 2002.

Geography 
Abramovo is located 30 km west of Vologda (the district's administrative centre) by road. Yakovtsevo is the nearest rural locality.

References 

Rural localities in Vologodsky District